Linfen Investment Group Co., Ltd. is a Chinese sovereign wealth fund of Linfen Municipal Government, Shanxi Province. The company was the holding company of several utilities of the city.

In July 2016, Linfen Investment Group invested in a private equity fund based in Ningbo for 28.53% stake, which in turn the fund owned 4.0434% stake of Leshi Zhixin, a subsidiary of Le.com. Founder of Le.com, Jia Yueting, was also from Linfen.

References

External links
  

Conglomerate companies of China
Companies based in Shanxi
Companies owned by the provincial government of China